The 1st Carmen Awards, presented by the Andalusian Film Academy, were held on 30 January 2022 at the  in Málaga. The gala, broadcast on Canal Sur, was hosted by Adelfa Calvo and Pedro Casablanc.

History 
The Andalusian Film Academy disclosed the nominations on 14 December 2021. The statuette was made of polymer resin.

Held at the Málaga's Teatro Cervantes on 30 January 2022, the ceremony had support from the Andalusian regional ministry of Culture, Canal Sur Televisión, Ayuntamiento de Málaga, Diputación de Málaga,  and SGAE, among others. It was hosted by Adelfa Calvo and Pedro Casablanc and it featured musical performances by Derby's Motoreta Burrito Cachimba, Maui de Utrera, Toreros con chanclas, and Danza Invisible.

The award for best picture, presented by Belén Cuesta and Álvaro Morte, was given to Manuel Martín Cuenca's The Daughter, that also clinched another three awards (including Director and Screenplay). Undercover Wedding Crashers won the most awards (6).

Winners and nominees 
The winners and nominees are listed as follows:

Honorary Carmen Award 
In addition to the competitive awards, Antonio Banderas received the honorary career award.

References

External links 
 Gala of the 1st Carmen Awards on CanalSur Más

January 2022 events in Spain
Cinema of Andalusia
Spanish film awards
2021 film awards